The Gruppo Sportivo Fiamme Oro is the sport section of the Italian police force Polizia di Stato.

The color of the competition jerseys of the athletes of the Fiamme Oro is crimson, therefore the athletes of the sports group are sometimes called cremisi (Italian translation of crimson).

Greatest athletes

Medal table

In his history Gruppo Sportivo Fiamme Oro won 41 olympic and paralympic gold medal, four of these between 2008 Summer Olympics and 2006 Winter Olympics (Valentina Vezzali, Roberto Cammarelle, Andrea Minguzzi and Enrico Fabris).

See also
Polizia di Stato
Italian military sports bodies
European Champion Clubs Cup (athletics)

References

External links

Fiamme Oro all medals
Fiamme oro athletics competitors profiles

 
Athletics clubs in Italy
Sports organizations established in 1954